Omalogyridae are a family of minute and microscopic sea snails, marine gastropod molluscs or micromolluscs in the informal group Lower Heterobranchia. Adult shells are usually smaller than 1 millimeter.

This family is poorly known and is tentatively placed in the unresolved infraclass "Lower Heterobranchia". Studies of this group are sketchy and miss or omit the basic information about taxonomy or distribution.

Genera
Genera within the family Omalogyridae include:
 Ammonicera Vayssiére, 1893
 Omalogyra Jeffreys, 1867
 Retrotortina Chaster, 1896
 † Schobertinella Nützel & Gründel, 2015 
 Genera brought into synonymy
 Ammonicerina O.G. Costa, 1861: synonym of Omalogyra Jeffreys, 1859
 Helisalia Laseron, 1954: synonym of Omalogyra Jeffreys, 1859
 Homalogyra Jeffreys, 1867: synonym of Omalogyra Jeffreys, 1859

References

 Bouchet, P., Rocroi, J.-P. (2005). Classification and nomenclator of gastropod families. Malacologia. 47(1-2): 1-397 .

External links 
 
 Powell A. W. B., New Zealand Mollusca, William Collins Publishers Ltd, Auckland, New Zealand 1979 
 Sars, G.O. (1878). Bidrag til Kundskaben om Norges arktiske Fauna. I. Mollusca Regionis Arcticae Norvegiae. Oversigt over de i Norges arktiske Region Forekommende Bløddyr. Brøgger, Christiania. xiii + 466 pp., pls 1-34 & I-XVIII